Vaimaye Vellum is a 1997 Indian Tamil-language crime film directed by P. Vasu. The film stars Parthiban and Rachana Banerjee. It was released on 14 February 1997.

Plot
Perumal (Rajan P. Dev), a corrupt police officer, is transferred to the same area after 20 years.

In the past, Perumal's wife died during her delivery and Perumal felt that his newborn son brought him bad luck. Perumal later married Saraswathi (Vennira Aadai Nirmala). Despite being a clever student, Raja was hated by his father while his stepmother Saraswathi took care of him like her own son. One day, Raja witnessed his father Perumal taking bribe from a woman. He stole the bribe from his father and put it in a temple donation box. To punish him, Perumal sent his innocent son to jail.

Raja (Parthiban) is now a rickshaw man and also a rowdy who cannot tolerate the injustice so he often goes to jail. Meanwhile, Maari (Jojan), a rich industrialist, and his henchman Kaasi (Majid) kidnap the children of rich businessmen and ransom them. A journalist is determined to stop this and hires Raja for protecting his daughter Meena (Rachana Banerjee) from Alex's henchmen. Soon, Raja clashes with Maari, Kaasi and his father Perumal.

Cast

Parthiban as Raja (Yama Dharmaraja)
Rachana Banerjee as Meena 
Rajan P. Dev as Perumal
Visu
Radha Ravi as Rajendran
Janagaraj as Michael
Vennira Aadai Nirmala as Saraswathi
Mathew Chemmarapally as 1st Doctor 
Jojan as Maari
Majid as Kaasi
Hemanth Ravan as Sivaram
Mohan V. Ram as Mohan Ram
Prathapachandran
Vijay Krishnaraj 
Sachu
Master Mahendran as Raja (young)
Pandu
Mayilsamy as Mayilsamy
Chelladurai
Kullamani
Jyothi Meena
Jyothi Lakshmi
T. K. Rajeswari

Soundtrack

The film score and the soundtrack were composed by Deva. The soundtrack, released in 1997, features 6 tracks with lyrics written by Vaali.

Release
The film opened to positive reviews from critics. Geocities wrote "The strength and the weakness of the movie is its story itself. Though the core story is very interesting, it is also unbeleivable sometimes. This could have been avoided by good screenplay and direction. But apparently director P.Vasu has spent most of his time in masala things."

References

1997 films
1990s Tamil-language films
Films directed by P. Vasu
Films scored by Deva (composer)